Ali Haider (Urdu:علی حیدر, born 22 September 1967) is a Pakistani singer-songwriter, actor, fashion designer and television host. 

He had a number of hit songs in the 1990s, including Poorani Jeans, which appears on his 1993 album Sandesa.

Personal life

He married in 2006. After the death of his young son in 2009, Ali Haider quit making music for some time and turned to religion.

Career

Music
He began his music career in 1988 and gained popularity in the 1990s.

In 2012 he returned to mainstream music after a three-year break following the death of his son, a period during he was mainly involved in Islamic music, singing hamd and naat.

Acting
He became an actor in the mid-1990s, with roles in PTV dramas such as Tum Se Kehna Tha.

He acted in a Pakistani film, Chalo Ishq Larain, released in 2002. 

In 2013 he returned to TV with the sitcom Ek aur Ek Dhai.

Fashion design
He has been designing under his own clothing label Qarar.

Hosting
Having previously hosted religious TV shows on different channels, in 2021 he became the host of his own The Ali Haider Show, running on American channel NTV Houston.

Discography
Studio albums

Compilation albums
 The Best of Ali Haider

Filmography
Film

Television

Telefilm

See also
 List of Pakistani musicians
 List of Pakistani actors

References

External links
 
 Ali Haider official website

1967 births
Living people
Muhajir people
Pakistani male film actors
Pakistani male television actors
Pakistani pop singers
Pakistani playback singers
Pakistani fashion designers
Pakistani television hosts
NED University of Engineering & Technology alumni
Male actors from Karachi
Musicians from Karachi
Coke Studio (Pakistani TV program)